Pencae is a village in the community of Llanarth, Ceredigion, Wales, which is 68.2 miles (109.8 km) from Cardiff and 184 miles (296 km) from London. Pencae is represented in the Senedd by Elin Jones (Plaid Cymru) and is part of the Ceredigion constituency in the House of Commons.

See also 
 Strumble Head
 List of localities in Wales by population

References 

Villages in Ceredigion